Tadeusz Rutkowski (born 25 April 1951 in Kraków) is a Polish former weightlifter who competed in the 1976 Summer Olympics and in the 1980 Summer Olympics.

References

1951 births
Living people
Polish male weightlifters
Olympic weightlifters of Poland
Weightlifters at the 1976 Summer Olympics
Weightlifters at the 1980 Summer Olympics
Olympic bronze medalists for Poland
Olympic medalists in weightlifting
Sportspeople from Kraków
Medalists at the 1980 Summer Olympics
Medalists at the 1976 Summer Olympics
20th-century Polish people
21st-century Polish people